Kristie Ahn and Quinn Gleason were the defending champions but only Gleason chose to defend her title, partnering Francesca Di Lorenzo. Gleason and Di Lorenzo lost in the quarterfinals to Sophie Chang and Alexandra Mueller.

Irina Bara and Sílvia Soler Espinosa won the title after defeating Jessica Pegula and Maria Sanchez 6–4, 6–2 in the final.

Seeds

Draw

Draw

References
Main Draw

Space Coast Pro Tennis Classic - Doubles